These are the New Territories East results of the 2004 Hong Kong legislative election. The election was held on 12 September 2004 and all 7 seats in New Territories East where consisted of North District, Tai Po District, Sai Kung District and Sha Tin District were contested. The pro-democracy camp formed a electoral coalition "7.1 United Front" aimed at four seats, however due to the largest remainder method the wasted votes contributed to Li Kwok-ying who placed second on the Democratic Alliance for the Betterment of Hong Kong ticket. Radical democrat Leung Kwok-hung of April Fifth Action also won a seat for the first time.

Overall results
Before election:

Change in composition:

Candidates list

See also
Legislative Council of Hong Kong
Hong Kong legislative elections
2004 Hong Kong legislative election

References

2004 Hong Kong legislative election